Awainggale is a village in Ye Township in the Mon State of south-east Myanmar. It is located approximately 16 kilometres north-west of Ye city.

Nearby towns and villages include Andin (6.48km), Saiye (6.48km), Thingangyun (3.51km), Thinbawzeik (5.92km), Taungbon (4.07km), Hmeinsein (4.07km) and Zuntalin (2.59km).

References

Populated places in Mon State